Hednota xylophaea is a moth in the family Crambidae. It was described by Edward Meyrick in 1887. It is found in Australia, where it has been recorded from South Australia.

References

Crambinae
Moths described in 1887